Kristoffer Lepsøe (15 March 1922 – 26 March 2006) was a Norwegian competition rower and Olympic medalist. He received a bronze medal in the men's eight at the 1948 Summer Olympics, as a member of the Norwegian team.

Lepsøe received a bronze medal in coxless four at the 1949 European championships. He competed in the coxless four at the 1952 Summer Olympics.

References

1922 births
2006 deaths
Norwegian male rowers
Olympic rowers of Norway
Rowers at the 1948 Summer Olympics
Rowers at the 1952 Summer Olympics
Olympic bronze medalists for Norway
Olympic medalists in rowing
Medalists at the 1948 Summer Olympics
Sportspeople from Bergen
European Rowing Championships medalists